McIlwraith, McEacharn & Co was an Australian shipping company.

History
McIlwraith, McEacharn & Co (MMC) was founded in 1875 in London by Scottish sea captains, Andrew McIlwraith and Malcolm McEacharn. In 1876 it began operating ships to take British migrants to the Australia under contract to the Government of Queensland. In 1891, it relocated it headquarters to Melbourne.

MMC built up a coal bunkering businesses, had a shareholding in Mount Morgan Mine and had associations with Burns Philp and Castlemaine Perkins. In 1958, MMC became a shareholder in bulk carrier operator Bulkships in partnership with the Adelaide Steamship Company. 

In May 1993, MMC was sold to Cyprus Mining Company.

References

1875 establishments in England
Companies based in Melbourne
Companies formerly listed on the Australian Securities Exchange
Defunct shipping companies of Australia
Transport companies established in 1875